The Waiting List is a 2000 film directed by Juan Carlos Tabío. It was screened in the Un Certain Regard section at the 2000 Cannes Film Festival. It is a co-production among companies from Spain, Cuba, France, and Mexico; including Tornasol Films, ICAIC, DMVB, Tabasco Films, Producciones Amaranta and Road Movies Fillm Produktionen.

In the film, people waiting in a bus station start building a little society of their own.

Cast

See also 
 List of Spanish films of 2000
 List of Cuban films

References

External links
 
 Lista de espera at CubaCine.cu 

Cuban comedy-drama films
Spanish comedy-drama films
French comedy-drama films
Mexican comedy-drama films
2000s Spanish films
2000s French films
2000s Mexican films
2000s Spanish-language films
2000 comedy-drama films
Films directed by Juan Carlos Tabío
Tornasol Films films